Liebenthal is a city in Rush County, Kansas, United States.  As of the 2020 census, the population of the city was 92.  It is located 8 miles north of La Crosse.

History
Liebenthal was founded in 1876 by a colony of Volga Germans, many of whom came from Liebenthal, Russia.

Geography
Liebenthal is located at  (38.654948, -99.320625).

Climate
The climate in this area is characterized by hot, humid summers and generally mild to cool winters.  According to the Köppen Climate Classification system, Liebenthal has a humid subtropical climate, abbreviated "Cfa" on climate maps.

Demographics

2010 census
As of the census of 2010, there were 103 people, 47 households, and 31 families residing in the city. The racial makeup of the city was 98.1% White and 1.9% from two or more races.

There were 47 households, of which 19.1% had children under the age of 18 living with them, 51.1% were married couples living together, 10.6% had a female householder with no husband present, 4.3% had a male householder with no wife present, and 34.0% were non-families. 31.9% of all households were made up of individuals, and 12.8% had someone living alone who was 65 years of age or older. The average household size was 2.19 and the average family size was 2.74.

The median age in the city was 47.1 years. 15.5% of residents were under the age of 18; 4.8% were between the ages of 18 and 24; 23.3% were from 25 to 44; 38.9% were from 45 to 64; and 17.5% were 65 years of age or older. The gender makeup of the city was 51.5% male and 48.5% female.

2000 census
As of the census of 2000, there were 111 people, 48 households, and 32 families residing in the city. The racial makeup of the city was 98.20% White, 0.90% Native American, and 0.90% from two or more races.

There were 48 households, out of which 22.9% had children under the age of 18 living with them, 52.1% were married couples living together, 4.2% had a female householder with no husband present, and 33.3% were non-families. 29.2% of all households were made up of individuals, and 16.7% had someone living alone who was 65 years of age or older. The average household size was 2.31 and the average family size was 2.81.

In the city, the population was spread out, with 19.8% under the age of 18, 3.6% from 18 to 24, 31.5% from 25 to 44, 27.0% from 45 to 64, and 18.0% who were 65 years of age or older. The median age was 42 years. For every 100 females, there were 122.0 males. For every 100 females age 18 and over, there were 111.9 males.

The median income for a household in the city was $21,875, and the median income for a family was $29,792. Males had a median income of $26,250 versus $14,375 for females. The per capita income for the city was $14,342. There were no families and 11.1% of the population living below the poverty line, including no under eighteens and 20.0% of those over 64.

Education
The community is served by La Crosse USD 395 public school district.

References

Further reading

External links
 City of Liebenthal
 Liebenthal - Directory of Public Officials
 Liebenthal Aerial Photographs
 History of Cities in Rush County
 Liebenthal Info, Legends of Kansas
 Liebenthal city map, KDOT

Cities in Kansas
Cities in Rush County, Kansas